The Florida Gulf Coast Eagles men's basketball team is the men's basketball team that represents Florida Gulf Coast University in Fort Myers, Florida, United States. The school's team currently competes in the ASUN Conference.

In 2002, Florida Gulf Coast became an independent member of NCAA Division II. Florida Gulf Coast also started its men's basketball team, with Dave Balza as head coach from the inaugural 2002–03 to the 2010–11 season. He was succeeded by Andy Enfield from 2011–13, who took the Eagles to the Sweet Sixteen as the first ever 15-seed to do such. After putting FGCU on the map with their new "Dunk City" moniker, Enfield accepted the men's basketball position at USC. Joe Dooley then assumed the role from 2013-2018 before accepting the Head Coach position at East Carolina Michael Fly served as head coach from 2018 to 2022, before being replaced by former Penn State head coach Pat Chambers. In 2006, Florida Gulf Coast applied for NCAA Division I status and became a transitory Division I effective in the 2007–08 season. Florida Gulf Coast became a full Division I member on August 11, 2011.

The Eagles men's basketball team is best known for their run in the 2013 NCAA Division I men's basketball tournament, their first since moving up to Division I.  In the Round of 64, the Eagles defeated the #2 seed Georgetown 78–68. It was only the seventh time that a 15th seed had defeated a 2nd seed, and the second-highest margin of victory for one.  Two days later in the Round of 32, the Eagles defeated the #7 seed San Diego State 81–71, becoming the first 15th seed to ever advance to the Sweet 16. The school was referred to as "Dunk City" or "Florida Dunk Coast" on many media outlets such as ESPN and CBS due to their high-flying athletic finishing style.

Season results

The Eagles participated in their first Division I postseason tournament in 2013, qualifying for the NCAA Tournament by winning the ASUN Conference Championship, beating top-seeded Mercer in the conference tournament final.   On March 22, 2013, the Eagles, the 15th seed in the South Region, scored one of the biggest upsets in NCAA Tournament history, defeating second-seeded Georgetown 78–68.  They were only the seventh #15 seed to defeat a #2 seed, the first being Richmond in its 1991 victory over Syracuse.  Two days later, they defeated seventh seeded San Diego State to become the first #15 seed ever to advance to the Sweet Sixteen. Their run ended there in a 62–50 loss to third seeded Florida. This is "officially" the fourth-deepest run by a first-time tournament participant in NCAA history, behind only Indiana State advancing all the way to the national championship game in 1979 and Charlotte and Georgia reaching the Final Four in 1977 and 1983, respectively. Southwestern Louisiana, now known as Louisiana–Lafayette, advanced to the Sweet 16 in its first appearance as well, in 1972, but that appearance was vacated due to NCAA sanctions. Coach Andy Enfield was hired by USC on April 1. To replace him, the Eagles hired Joe Dooley, an assistant from Kansas.

Postseason

NCAA Division I Tournament results
The Eagles have appeared in the NCAA Division I Tournament three times. Their combined record is 3–3. Their highest seed was #14 in 2017.

NIT results
The Eagles have appeared in the National Invitation Tournament (NIT) two times. Their combined record is 0–2.

CIT results
The Eagles have appeared in the CollegeInsider.com Postseason Tournament (CIT) one time. Their record is 0–1.

The Basketball Classic results
The Eagles have appeared in The Basketball Classic one time. Their record is 1–1.

NCAA Division II Tournament results
The Eagles have appeared in the NCAA Division II Tournament one time. Their record is 0–1.

Notable international players
 	
 Eli Abaev (born 1998), American-Israeli basketball player for Hapoel Be'er Sheva in the Israeli Basketball Premier League

References

External links

 
2002 establishments in Florida
Basketball teams established in 2002